Lucknow West is a constituency of the Uttar Pradesh Legislative Assembly covering the city of Western part of Lucknow in the Lucknow district of Uttar Pradesh, India and VVPAT facility with EVMs was here in 2017 U. P. assembly polls.

Lucknow West is one of five assembly constituencies in the Lucknow Lok Sabha constituency. Since 2008, this assembly constituency is numbered 171 amongst 403 constituencies.

Currently this seat belongs to Samajwadi Party candidate Armaan Khan who won in last Assembly election of 2022 Uttar Pradesh Legislative Elections defeating Bhartiya Janta Party candidate Anjani Kumar Srivastava by a margin of 8,184 votes.

Members of the Legislative Assembly

Election results

2022

2017

2012

References

Assembly constituencies of Uttar Pradesh